is a former Japanese football player. He played for Japan national team.

Club career

Ishikawa was born in Yokosuka on 12 May 1981. He joined Yokohama F. Marinos from youth team in 2000. Although he was Japan U-20 national team player, he could not play many matches in the club. He moved to FC Tokyo in April 2002. He got many opportunities to play soon. In the 2000s, the club won the champions 2004 and 2009 J.League Cup. In 2009, he also scored 15 goals and was elected Best Eleven. In the 2010s, the club was relegated to J2 League end of 2010 season. In 2011, the club won the champions J2 League and Emperor's Cup. From 2012, the club played in J1 League. However he could not play many matches for injury from 2014. He retired at the end of the 2017 season.

National team career
In June 2001, Ishikawa was selected Japan U-20 national team for 2001 World Youth Championship. He wore the number 10 shirt and played full time in all 3 matches.

In December 2003, Ishikawa was selected Japan national team for 2003 East Asian Football Championship. At this tournament, on 7 December, he debuted against Hong Kong. He also played Japan for in 2004. In August, he was also selected Japan U-23 national team for 2004 Summer Olympics.

In August 2009, Ishikawa was selected Japan for the first time in 5 years. He played 6 games for Japan until 2012.

Club statistics

National team statistics

Appearances in major competitions

Honours

Individual
 J.League Best XI : 2009

Team
 J.League Cup : 2004
 J2 League : 2011
 Emperor's Cup : 2011

References

External links

 
 Japan National Football Team Database
 
 Official Twitter account
 

1981 births
Living people
Association football people from Kanagawa Prefecture
Japanese footballers
Japan youth international footballers
Japan international footballers
J1 League players
J2 League players
J3 League players
Yokohama F. Marinos players
FC Tokyo players
FC Tokyo U-23 players
Olympic footballers of Japan
Footballers at the 2004 Summer Olympics
Footballers at the 2002 Asian Games
Asian Games medalists in football
Asian Games silver medalists for Japan
Medalists at the 2002 Asian Games
Association football midfielders